The 1997 Skate Canada International was the third event of six in the 1997–98 ISU Champions Series, a senior-level international invitational competition series. It was held in Halifax, Nova Scotia on November 6–9. Medals were awarded in the disciplines of men's singles, ladies' singles, pair skating, and ice dancing. Skaters earned points toward qualifying for the 1997–98 Champions Series Final.

Results

Men

Ladies

Pairs

Ice dancing

References

Skate Canada International, 1997
Skate Canada International
1997 in Canadian sports 
1997 in Nova Scotia
November 1997 sports events in Canada